William Gardner VC DCM (3 March 1821 – 24 October 1897) was a Scottish recipient of the Victoria Cross, the highest and most prestigious award for gallantry in the face of the enemy that can be awarded to British and Commonwealth forces.

Details
He was 37 years old, and a colour-sergeant in the 42nd Regiment of Foot (later The Black Watch (Royal Highlanders)), British Army during the Indian Mutiny when the following deed took place on 5 May 1858 at Bareilly, India for which he was awarded the VC:

Further information
He later achieved the rank of sergeant-Major. His medal was sold by one of his descendants to raise money for charity. His VC is on display in the Lord Ashcroft Gallery at the Imperial War Museum, London.

References

Monuments to Courage (David Harvey, 1999)
The Register of the Victoria Cross (This England, 1997)
Scotland's Forgotten Valour (Graham Ross, 1995)

External links
Location of grave and VC medal (Strathclyde)

British recipients of the Victoria Cross
Indian Rebellion of 1857 recipients of the Victoria Cross
Black Watch soldiers
1821 births
1897 deaths
People from South Lanarkshire
British Army personnel of the Crimean War
Recipients of the Distinguished Conduct Medal
British Army recipients of the Victoria Cross